Fabbrica Curone (Piedmontese: Frògna) is a comune (municipality) in the Province of Alessandria in the Italian region Piedmont, located in the upper valley of the Curone stream, about  southeast of Turin and about  southeast of Alessandria.

Fabbrica Curone borders the following municipalities: Albera Ligure, Cabella Ligure, Gremiasco, Montacuto, Santa Margherita di Staffora, Varzi, and Zerba.

History
A possession of the Abbey of San Colombano of Bobbio, it received a castle and was under the bishops of Tortona after 1157. Later it was an imperial fief under the Malaspina, who held it until 1797.

Main sights
Pieve of Santa Maria Assunta, a Romanesque edifice with a stone portal surmounted by a Romanesque lunette.
Museum of the Peasant Civilization, in the frazione of Lunassi.

The other frazione of Caldirola, elevation  is a ski resort.

Demographic evolution

References

External links
 Official website

Cities and towns in Piedmont